The Commander-in-Chief, Ceylon was a military post created during World War II to form a unified command for all British military, naval and air units in Ceylon. The first to be appointed to this post was Admiral Sir Geoffrey Layton, whose powers exceeded that of the governor, in 1942. He was succeeded by Lieutenant General Sir Harry Wetherall in 1945.

See also
Sri Lanka Army
Commander of the Army
General Officer Commanding, Ceylon

References

External links
Commandants

 
Senior appointments of the British Army
Military personnel of the British Empire
Military history of Ceylon in World War II
Ceylonese military personnel of World War II
Ce
British military commanders in chief